The Commission of Inquiry into the Education System of Kenya commonly referred to as the Davy Koech Commission  was a Kenya Government Commission established on 15 May 1998 by the then President Daniel arap Moi. The commission was led by Dr. Davy Kiprotich Koech and was to investigated the question of the appropriateness of Kenya’s 8-4-4 education system

Membership
The Commission's membership included:
Prof. Davy Kiprotich Koech - Chairperson
 Prof. Florida A. Karani Vice-Chairperson
 Dr. (Prof.) Joseph Maina Mungai (Joint Secretary)
 Prof. David K. Some (Joint Secretary)
 Johnson M. Hungu  (Joint Secretary)
 Hastings W.O. Okoth-Ogendo  
 Eddah W. Gachukia
 Filemona F. Indire
 Jack G. Okech  
 Joseph D. Kimura  
 Abdulghafur H.S. El-Busaidy  
 Abdisalam S. Mohamed 
 Ambrose A. Adongo 
 George K. King’oriah 
 Mwakai K. Sio 
 Nicodemus Kirima
 Emmanuel S. Rumpe
 Joel J. Ngatiari
 Jackson Kang’ali
 Michael M. Ndurumo
 Nathaniel K. Chepkener
 Noah C. Chune
 Peter M. Kavisi
 Joan A. Okudo
 Swafiya M. Said

Report
The commission completed its work in August 1999 and handed its report to the President in October 1999. 
some of the recommendations include;
 Replacement of 8-4-4 system with TIQET
 Expansion of compulsory basic education from 8 years to 12 years
 No examination between primary and secondary
 Reduction of subjects at secondary to ease curicculum
 Introduced a pre-university level to allow student to mature before going to university

References

Law of Kenya